John Fery (1859–1934) (born Johann Nepomuk Levy) was an Austrian-born painter, known for his works of the  Western United States. He was a painter of outdoor scenes, whose largest customer was the Great Northern Railway.

Fery's paintings were hung in train stations and other places, promoting travel, particularly to Glacier National Park. "Painting the Wilderness: John Fery and Contemporaries", exhibit through Sept. 15, 2014 at the Wildling Art Museum, 1511-B Mission Dr., Solvang, California. www.wildlingmuseum.org

His grandson, John B. Fery (1930–2017), was chief executive officer of Boise Cascade Corporation from 1972 to 1995.

References

External links
WildlifeArt.org - John Fery
Hockaday Museum - John Fery
Museum of Wisconsin Art - John C. Fery
Settlers West Galleries - John Fery

1859 births
1934 deaths
19th-century Austrian painters
19th-century Austrian male artists
Austrian male painters
20th-century Austrian painters
20th-century Austrian male artists